Denis Aleksandrovich Fedenko (born 9 February 1999) is a Russian football player. He plays for FC Orenburg-2.

Club career
He made his debut in the Russian Professional Football League for FC Orenburg-2 on 27 July 2017 in a game against FC Chelyabinsk.

He made his debut for the main squad of FC Orenburg on 25 September 2018 in a Russian Cup game against FC Dynamo Barnaul.

References

External links
 
 
 Profile by Russian Professional Football League

1999 births
Living people
Russian people of Ukrainian descent
Russian footballers
Association football midfielders
FC Orenburg players
FC Nosta Novotroitsk players